Everybody's Famous! is a 2000 Belgian satirical comedy film directed by Dominique Deruddere about a young teenage girl who is pushed by her poor parents to become a musical star.  It was nominated for Best Foreign Language Film at the 73rd Academy Awards.

Plot 
Seventeen-year-old Marva Vereecken is a regular at singing contests which she never wins. When her father, Jean, gets laid off, he decides to kidnap the number one singer in the country, Debbie. The kidnapping greatly increases sales of Debbie's latest single, much to the pleasant surprise of Michael, Debbie's manager. Michael in turn proposes a secret deal to make Marva a star if Jean agrees to keep Debbie out of the way for as long as Michael wants.

Cast 
 Josse De Pauw – Jean Vereecken
 Eva Van Der Gucht – Marva Vereecken
 Werner De Smedt – Willy Van Outreve
 Thekla Reuten – Debbie
 Victor Löw – Michael Jensen
  - Chantal Vereecken
 Ianka Fleerackers – Gaby
  - Lizzy
  - Knappe man
  - NTO directeur
  - Omroepster
 Marc Didden – Cameraman

Reception

Critical response
Everybody's Famous has an approval rating of 55% on review aggregator website Rotten Tomatoes, based on 53 reviews, and an average rating of 5.39/10. The website's critical consensus states, "Though some critics consider Everybody Famous too lightweight to have deserved a slot among the Academy Awards foreign film nominations, this whacky satire of the cult of celebrity makes for loopy, cheerful fun". Metacritic assigned the film a weighted average score of 60 out of 100, based on 18 critics, indicating "mixed or average reviews".

Awards and nominations

See also 
List of Belgian submissions for Academy Award for Best Foreign Language Film
Fanney Khan, an Indian remake of Everybody's Famous!

References

External links 

2000 films
2000 comedy-drama films
2000s satirical films
Belgian comedy-drama films
Belgian satirical films
2000s Dutch-language films
2000s Spanish-language films
Films about dysfunctional families
Films shot in Antwerp
2000s English-language films
2000 multilingual films
Belgian multilingual films
Dutch-language Belgian films